Truer Living with a Youthful Vengeance is the first studio album from Dynasty. Strike First Records released the album on May 24, 2011.

Critical reception

Awarding the album four stars from HM Magazine, Brittany McNeal states, "the album has thoughtful lyrics that provide an attention-grabbing full effect." Ian Webber, rating the album seven out of ten for Cross Rhythms, writes, "At times punk influences can be heard as the onslaught from these 10 tracks never lets up." Giving the album three and a half stars at Christ Core, Brian Morrissette says, "Truer Living with a Youthful Vengeance is a great album, but I sadly think this LP will be overlooked unjustly by many fans of the hardcore genre."

BMer, awarding the album three stars for Indie Vision Music, writes, "Truer Living With a Youthful Vengeance is an album that you will throw on, and throw down." Giving the album two and a half stars from Jesus Freak Hideout, Michael Weaver states, "Dynasty brings a pretty good sound back to what has felt like a lost genre." Wayne Reimer, rating the album two stars at Jesus Freak Hideout, says, "what we have here in Truer Living... is an honest mess, with real passion and no-holds-barred faith-filled lyrics, but unfortunately a sub-par performance." Signaling in a 1.5 out of ten review at Mind Equal Blown, Garry Lee describes, "Truer Living With a Youthful Vengeance is a masterclass in musical mediocrity."

Track listing

References

2011 debut albums
Dynasty (hardcore band) albums
Facedown Records albums